LeJon Dante Powell (born August 25, 1973) is a former Major League Baseball outfielder who played for four seasons. He played for the San Francisco Giants (1997–1998, 2001) and the Arizona Diamondbacks (1999).

External links
, or Retrosheet, or Pura Pelota (Venezuelan Winter League)

1973 births
Living people
African-American baseball players
Albuquerque Dukes players
Arizona Diamondbacks players
Baseball players from Long Beach, California
Cal State Fullerton Titans baseball players
Everett Giants players
Fargo-Moorhead RedHawks players
Fresno Grizzlies players
Major League Baseball outfielders
Phoenix Firebirds players
San Antonio Missions players
San Francisco Giants players
San Jose Giants players
Shreveport Captains players
Tiburones de La Guaira players
American expatriate baseball players in Venezuela
Tucson Sidewinders players
21st-century African-American sportspeople
20th-century African-American sportspeople
Millikan High School alumni